The "die throw" is a method of review which is often used in Norway. It is characterized by the use of a white-on-red die graphic to represent the movie's rating in the review, and is similar to stars or letters used in other countries.

The format was introduced by film director and then-film critic Arne Skouen, who, writing for Verdens Gang on 31 March 1952, stated the need of "having a film première characterized in a short, concise form". To do this, he used a standard die with six pips, where one marked the lowest possible rating of a film, and six marked the highest. In some cases, a die with zero pips has been used, meaning awful. Similarly, people sometimes allude to "seven pips", meaning extraordinarily good.

Usage

In time, the die throw spread to other parts of the media. It is used by about forty Norwegian newspapers, numerous magazines and television shows for review purposes. An analysis in 2002 found die throws in 41 out of 254 daily newspapers in Norway. Secondly, it was used to characterize several other products than films. Even people have been reviewed with "throws of the die", for instance to grade the achievements of a political officeholder.

It has also been used for blurbing, as a quick, graphic way of expressing the worthiness of a product. Writer Ari Behn gained some note when he, after receiving a favourable die throw review with six pips, tattooed the die on his upper arm for maximum exposure. At times, companies who use die throws for blurbs have been caught cheating, in that they claim positive die throw reviews which do not exist.

According to a 2005 master's thesis at the University of Bergen it is very seldom used outside of Norway, an exception being the Swedish newspaper Svenska Dagbladet. The die throw coincides with the grading system in Norwegian schools (excluding higher education), where 1 is the lowest and 6 is the highest grade. This grading system was not in use when the die throw review was introduced; it was introduced later.

Misuse
In 1998, the newspapers Verdens Gang, Dagbladet and Aftenposten brought legal charges against Nettavisen for extracting die throws from reviews and reprinting it. The three newspapers argued that this was an abuse of their reviews, since the die was taken out of context, and won the case in Oslo City Court. In 2002, Verdens Gang wanted to add their own touch to the die throw review, which they had created, and added the newspaper's logo to the die graphic.

References

Mass media in Norway
1952 introductions